2–8a Rutland Gate is a large terraced house on Rutland Gate in the Knightsbridge district of London, overlooking Hyde Park. It was formerly four houses and built as 2 Rutland Gate and 4–8a Rutland Gate, but the houses were converted into a single property during the mid 1980s.

Description
2–8a Rutland Gate is a large white stuccoed house originally built as a terrace of four houses in the mid 19th-century. The four houses were later converted into a single property. A competition to redesign the house was held in 1982 and won by the architectural firm YRM. The present 2–8a Rutland Gate was built between 1985 and 1987, replacing 2 Rutland Gate and 4–8a Rutland Gate, a group of 1930s houses. The Survey of London describes the design of the present 2–8a Rutland Gate as "One of YRM's least Modern designs ... the building comprises a rather bland white palazzo."

The interior of 2–8a Rutland Gate has a swimming pool, underground parking, several lifts, and substantial interior decoration of gold leaf. The interior of the house was described as having been decorated by Monzer Hammoud by The Guardian and by the French designer Alberto Pinto by the Evening Standard in July 2015. The windows of the house are believed to be bulletproof.

2–8a Rutland Gate has been likened to two other palatial London houses, Bridgewater House in St James's, and Dudley House in Mayfair.

History
Since 1982, 2–8a Rutland Gate has been owned by Yunak Corporation, registered in the Dutch Antilles tax haven of Curaçao. The house was the London residence of the former Prime Minister of Lebanon and billionaire businessman Rafic Hariri, until his assassination in 2005. Following Hariri's death, the house was given as a gift to the then–Crown Prince of Saudi Arabia, Sultan bin Abdulaziz Al Saud (1928–2011), who had business links with Hariri. In 2012, 2–8a Rutland Gate was reported to be for sale at an asking price of £300 million, which would have made it the most expensive house in Britain if realized, surpassing the £140 million paid for Park Place in Berkshire by the Russian banker Andrey Borodin.

The house remained unsold and was later valued at £140 million in early 2015. In June 2015, contents from the property were put up for auction in a 1,252 lot sale lasting two days. Items for sale included Murano glass chandeliers, gold plated waste paper bins, and 24 marble bathrooms.

A loan of £55 million to fund the cost of stripping out the property was secured against the house in December 2014, issued by Omni Capital Partners, a financial services company owned by the property developers Christian and Nick Candy. After 2–8a Rutland Gate had not sold by July 2015, the Saudi owners of the property were planning to turn the house into luxury apartments.

In April 2020, Chinese businessman Cheung Chung-kiu bought the property for £210 million, which would make it easily the most expensive house ever sold in the UK.

In October 2022 The Guardian quoted a Financial Times article which reported that Hui Ka Yan, founder and chair of Evergrande and once China's richest man, was ultimately behind it, and that it has been put up for sale again.

In February 2023 the house was sold to a low-profile Arabian/Antiguan heir named Mohannad Al Marar as shown on public records for 2-8 RUTLAND GATE LIMITED for over £300M which makes it the most expensive home ever sold in the U.K's history.

References

Houses completed in the 19th century
Houses in the City of Westminster
Knightsbridge